The Abbotsford Pilots are a junior "B" ice hockey team based in Abbotsford, British Columbia, Canada. They are members of the Harold Brittain Conference of the Pacific Junior Hockey League (PJHL). The Pilots play their home games at MSA Arena. Jack Goesen is the team's president and general manager, Daniell Lange is the associate head coach.

History

Mission

The Mission Pilots were formed in 1975, and played in Mission for thirteen years, when they relocated south to Abbotsford, where the team name was retained. While in Mission, the team won no league championships. They played out of the Mission Arena on 7th avenue.

Abbotsford 1988-2005

In 1988 the Mission Pilots relocated to Abbotsford, retaining the name, which was a name similar to that of the Abbotsford Flyers, a former Junior A level team in Abbotsford, that in itself was named for the Abbotsford International Airshow. In 1989, the Pilots won the league championship in only their second season in Abbotsford. The team suffered a 3-1 finals loss to the Richmond Sockeyes in the 1991-92 season, and did not win another championship until 1999, ten years after their first. The following year, the Pilots swept the Grandview Steelers to win the league championship, with player Brock Currie leading the league in scoring, and continued their success by winning the 2000 Cyclone Taylor Cup, and finished as consolation champions in the Keystone Cup. The following year the Pilots finished a disappointing fourth in the league, and lost in the league quarterfinals to the Sockeyes. But they rebounded the following year, winning the league again over the Delta Ice Hawks in the finals, before losing to the Sicamous Eagles in the final of the Cyclone Taylor Cup. Kiyomi Parsons was named league MVP. The following year, 2002-03, the Pilots finished first during the regular season, but lost 4-3 in the league finals to the Sockeyes again. In 2003-04, the Pilots slipped to fifth in the league standings, and did not win any trophies during the season, despite having a winning record of 22-18-2. They rebounded again the following year, defeating the Delta Ice Hawks in the final by a series score of 4-3, with Abbotsford goalie Travis Dyck being named league MVP.

2005-present

In 2005-06, the Pilots lost twice to the Ice Hawks, once in the league finals, and again in the Cyclone Taylor Cup championship. The following year the Pilots finished first in the league again, and defeated the Grandview Steelers by a score of 4-2 in the finals. They would win the league's regular season title again the following year, but lost to Grandview in the playoff championship by a score of 4-1. They would then lose in the league final three of the next four years, save for a first round loss to Aldergrove in 2009-10. In 2010-11, despite losing narrowly to the Ice Hawks in the finals again, the Pilots won the Cyclone Taylor Cup over the Victoria Cougars, and then crushed the Thunder Bay Northern Hawks in the final of the 2011 Keystone Cup to claim their first Western Canada championship. The following year they would win the Harold Brittain Division, but lost in the second round of the playoffs to the Aldergrove Kodiaks. They would lose to the Kodiaks in the second round for three straight years, including a Game 7 loss as heavy underdogs in 2014-15. In the 2015-16 season, the Pilots defeated the Kodiaks in the first round, before losing in the second round to eventual league champions Mission City Outlaws.

Season-by-season record

Note: GP = Games played, W = Wins, L = Losses, T = Ties, OT = Overtime Losses, Shootout losses & Ties Pts = Points, GF = Goals for, GA = Goals against

Staff and personnel

President and General Manager: Jack Goesen

Associate Head Coach: Daniell Lange

Associate Head Coach: Mitch Plevy

Awards and trophies
Keystone Cup
2011-12

Cyclone Taylor Cup
1999-00, 2011–12

PJHL Championship
1999-00, 2001–02, 2004–05, 2006–07

External links
Official website of the Abbotsford Pilots
Official website of the Pacific Junior Hockey League

References

Pacific Junior Hockey League teams
Ice hockey teams in British Columbia
Abbotsford, British Columbia
1975 establishments in British Columbia
Ice hockey clubs established in 1975